The Strongbow Saga is a historical fiction series by Judson Roberts. The Saga tells the story of Halfdan Hroriksson, a young Viking trying to avenge his brother's murder. The series weaves the story of the fictional Halfdan into the lives of actual historical figures of the period, including famous Viking leaders Ragnar Lodbrok, Ivar the Boneless, Bjorn Ironside, and Hastein, as well as Frankish leaders King Charles the Bald and Count Robert the Strong. Actual historical events form a backdrop for parts of the story, including a Danish attack up the Seine River in the year 845 which was reported in several contemporary Frankish sources, including the Annals of St. Bertin.

The series begins in Denmark around the year 845, but over the course of its projected 6 volumes the story's settings traverse much of the Viking world, including western Frankia in books two and three, Denmark and Sweden in book four, and Russia and Ireland in books five and six. The first four books are, Viking Warrior, Dragons from the Sea, The Road to Vengeance, and The Long Hunt. As of May 2018 Roberts has not revealed any kind of timeline for the release of the last two books, citing delays caused by a lack of historical data and health problems.

The first three volumes of The Strongbow Saga were originally published between 2006 and 2008 as young adult fiction by HarperCollins. The series was republished as general historical fiction, beginning in 2010, by Northman Books.

References
The Annals of St Bertin, trans. Janet Nelson (Manchester University Press 1991)
 Judson Roberts website
 Northman Books website

Young adult novel series
American young adult novels
American historical novels
Novels set in the Viking Age
Novels set in the 9th century
Cultural depictions of Ivar the Boneless
Cultural depictions of Ragnar Lodbrok